The Taleyfac River is a river in the United States territory of Guam.

It is crossed by Taleyfac Spanish Bridge, a historic stone arch bridge that is listed on the U.S. National Register of Historic Places.

See also
List of rivers of Guam

References

Rivers of Guam